The Cajundome is a 13,500-seat multi-purpose arena located in Lafayette, Louisiana on the South Campus of the University of Louisiana at Lafayette. It is home to the Louisiana Ragin' Cajuns men's and women's basketball programs in addition to hosting various University events and commencement ceremonies including high school graduations.

The arena hosts many regional concerts (seating for concerts 8,481 to 13,500) and special events, such as World Wrestling Entertainment (WWE) events and the annual outdoor Cajun Heartland State Fair, an eleven-day state fair that attracts over 175,000. The arena also hosts the annual Jr. Beta Club Louisiana state conventions for middle and elementary school students and previously held the Sr. Beta Conventions for high schoolers. The facility is a recognizable Lafayette landmark that was built by the State of Louisiana, funded by the City of Lafayette, and is owned by the University of Louisiana at Lafayette and managed by the Cajundome Commission.

Currently, the Cajundome is the largest basketball arena in the Sun Belt Conference, the largest college basketball arena in Louisiana, the third largest overall indoor arena in Louisiana (behind the Smoothie King Center in New Orleans and the Brookshire Grocery Arena in Bossier City), one of the largest mid-major college basketball arenas, and in the top 10 largest college basketball arenas in the deep south.

History

Development
The stadium was first proposed in 1978 by the Lafayette Chamber of Commerce, then headed by journalist Ron Gomez, a member of the Louisiana House of Representatives from 1980 to 1989.  The project was authorized during the administration of Governor David C. Treen and completed in 1985, during the administration of Mayor William Dudley "Dud" Lastrapes Jr., at a cost of $64 million.

Gomez envisioned a building for both university and municipal needs. In his autobiography, Gomez describes the project and its architect, Neil Nehrbass of Lafayette, accordingly:

Several of his peers openly questioned Nehrbass' ability to handle such an immense project. They had a good basis for their anxiety since Neil had never taken on such a colossal building. He was known, rather for his non-traditional and sometimes avant-garde designs. Nehrbass and I had been acquainted many years, and he recognized my passion for this project. We talked at great length about the building and the uses for it. Neil was the consummate artist. He dressed flamboyantly, chain smoked gold-tipped, pastel-colored cigarettes which he imported from England and was definitely not a sports fan. He had never attended a USL [since UL Lafayette] basketball game. But he was enthusiastic about this new project and visited the recently-opened domed facility in Biloxi, Mississippi, and Madison Square Garden in New York City to gain insight on how he would make the Lafayette structure unique.

Renovations
The arena underwent a $20 million renovation in 2016, providing seating, concession, accessibility and signage upgrades to the venue.

Sports

Arena football

Lafayette Roughnecks
The Lafayette Roughnecks of the AF2 played at the Cajundome in 2001.

Lafayette Wildcatters
The Lafayette Wildcatters of the Southern Indoor Football League played at the Cajundome from 2009 to 2010.

Basketball

Louisiana Ragin' Cajuns basketball
The Cajundome is home to the Louisiana Ragin' Cajuns men's basketball and Louisiana Ragin' Cajuns women's basketball programs.

Sun Belt Conference men's basketball tournaments
It hosted the 1998, 1999, and 2007 Sun Belt Conference men's basketball tournaments.

Boxing
On April 27, 2019, Regis Prograis defeated Kiryl Relikh in the sixth round by TKO to win the WBA super-lightweight championship.

Ice hockey

Louisiana IceGators
The Louisiana IceGators of the East Coast Hockey League played host in the Cajundome from 1995 to 2005. During that time, the arena earned the nickname 'The Frozen Swamp'. In 2005, the franchise folded due to financial problems and drops in attendance after the IceGators were in the Top 4 for attendance in the ECHL. In 2009, Danny Smith, a local businessman, decided to bring back the Louisiana IceGators but this time in the Southern Professional Hockey League. A few months after Smith bought it, the franchise was sold to E.C. "Chuck" Anselmo Jr. and E.C. "Chuck" Anselmo, III. In their first season, the IceGators played at Blackham Coliseum. In their second season, the IceGators moved to the Cajundome. In early 2016, the Louisiana IceGators and the SPHL announced that the IceGators would suspend operations for the 2016–17 season citing that the arena renovations would not be completed in time for the season.

Soccer

Lafayette SwampCats
The Cajundome was home to the Lafayette SwampCats of the EISL from 1997 to 1998.

Top 10 sports crowds at the Cajundome
 11,479 vs. Loyola Marymount (12/16/92)
 11,137 vs. New Orleans (02/01/92)
 10,802 vs. New Orleans (01/18/90)
 10,651 vs. Massachusetts (10/06/90)
 10,487 vs. Georgia (11/22/85)
 09,715 vs. Western Kentucky (02/05/94)
 09,153 vs. New Orleans (01/05/91)
 09,121 vs. South Alabama (03/03/98)
 09,121 vs. Western Kentucky (02/26/03)
 09,086 vs. Lamar (03/01/86)

Professional Wrestling
Numerous episodes of WWE television shows have been taped at the arena including WWE Raw, WWE SmackDown, WWE NXT, WWE Heat and WWF Jakked as well as episodes of WCW television shows WCW Thunder and WCW Worldwide.
 WWF House Show - March 20, 1988.
 WWF House Show - June 16, 1989.
 Superstars of Wrestling - January 26, 1997
Superstars of Wrestling - February 2, 1997
 Superstars of Wrestling - February 9, 1997
 Thunder - June 24, 1999
 Thunder - July 1, 1999
 Thunder - May 17, 2000
 WCW WorldWide - May 27, 2000
 RAW - August 21, 2000
 Jakked - August 26, 2000
 RAW - January 22, 2001
 Jakked - January 27, 2001
 RAW - December 17, 2001
 SmackDown - October 3, 2002
 RAW - September 1, 2003
 Heat - September 7, 2003
 RAW - January 22, 2007
 Heat - January 26, 2007
 RAW - July 9, 2007
 Heat - July 13, 2007
 RAW - March 17, 2008
 Heat - March 23, 2008
 RAW - June 8, 2009
 Superstars - June 11, 2009
 RAW - February 8, 2010
 NXT - December 14, 2010
 Superstars - December 16, 2010
 SmackDown - December 17, 2010
 RAW - October 3, 2011
 RAW - November 26, 2012
 Superstars - November 30, 2012
 RAW - February 18, 2013
 Superstars - February 22, 2013
 Main Event - April 8, 2014
 SmackDown - April 11, 2014
 RAW - September 15, 2014
 Superstars - September 18, 2014
 Main Event - June 9, 2015
 SmackDown - June 11, 2015
 Main Event - January 12, 2016
 SmackDown - January 14, 2016
 RAW - June 12, 2017
 Main Event - June 14, 2017
 SmackDown - September 11, 2018
 205 Live - September 11, 2018
 RAW - February 18, 2019
 Main Event - February 20, 2019

Convention Center 
In 2002, a new convention center addition to the arena was built. The new addition added 37,301 square feet (3,465 m²) of exhibit hall space to the Cajundome's 40,000 square feet (3,716 m²) of arena floor space plus 39,685 square feet (3687 m²) of meeting space including a 15,682 square foot (1457 m²) ballroom, 12,159 square feet (1130 m²) of prefunction space and a 17,590 square foot (1630 m²) outdoor mall holding up to 2,118 for outdoor events.

The Cajundome Convention Center offers multiple meeting space options ranging from a small board room of 10 guests to a 4,000 guest general session. These spaces can accommodate a number of events including corporate and leisure trade shows, corporate meetings and events, theater style presentations, private or public receptions and banquets, non-profit fundraising events, school dances and graduation ceremonies and celebrations, just to name a few. Rentals include assistance from our experiences and knowledgeable staff, easy load-in and access, and free on-site parking.

Artisan Catering is the exclusive caterer for the Cajundome Convention Center. Artisan's experienced and award winning culinary team is ready to plan your next event, and no matter how elaborate your vision is, can coordinate its culinary efforts with other local vendors to streamline the entire process for you.

The Cajundome Convention Center is also home to the annual Lafayette Home and Garden show and the Louisiana Future Business Leaders of America State Leadership Conference.

Use as a shelter
In 2005, following the aftermath of Hurricane Katrina and soon after Hurricane Rita, the Cajundome became one of the Federal Emergency Management Agency's evacuee shelters.  Staffed by Red Cross, Salvation Army, Americorp and a host of local charities, the facility became a center of relief for thousands.  The recently opened Convention Center addition was also utilized as a distribution logistics point and also housed a Special Needs Clinic.  This clinic served those needing additional care not deemed urgent or emergency by local area hospitals.

See also
 List of convention centers in the United States
 List of NCAA Division I basketball arenas
 List of music venues

References

External links

Basketball venues in Louisiana
Boxing venues in Louisiana
Buildings and structures in Lafayette, Louisiana
College basketball venues in the United States
Convention centers in Louisiana
Indoor arenas in Louisiana
Indoor ice hockey venues in Louisiana
Indoor soccer venues in Louisiana
Lafayette Roughnecks
Louisiana Ragin' Cajuns basketball
Music venues in Louisiana
Sports venues in Lafayette, Louisiana
Sports venues in Louisiana
University of Louisiana at Lafayette
1985 establishments in Louisiana